Viche may refer to:

 Viche, a Colombian alcoholic drink
 Veche (Ukrainian ), a popular assembly in medieval Slavic countries
 Aktsent (formerly Viche), a Ukrainian political party